A Sacred Oath: Memoirs of a Secretary of Defense During Extraordinary Times is a book by Mark Esper, 27th United States Secretary of Defense which was published on May 10, 2022 by HarperCollins.

In the book, Esper wrote that Donald Trump, President of the United States wanted to launch a missile into Mexico. He made many other claims about Trump.

Critical receptions and reviews 

Lloyd Green of The Guardian wrote "The ex-defense secretary’s memoir is scary and sobering – but don’t expect Republican leaders or voters to heed his warning" and John Bolton of The Wall Street Journal wrote "I still believe this. “A Sacred Oath” is not a gratuitous tell-all. It is a work of history.".

The book has been also reviewed by Laura Miller of Slate and Thomas F. Lynch III of National Defense University.

The book was listed in The New York Times Best Seller list.

References 

Political memoirs
Books about the Trump administration
HarperCollins books
2022 non-fiction books